The 1938 Washington and Lee Generals football team was an American football team that represented Washington and Lee University during the 1938 college football season as a member of the Southern Conference. In their sixth year under head coach Warren E. Tilson, the team compiled an overall record of 4–4–1, with a mark of 2–2 in conference play.

Schedule

References

Washington and Lee
Washington and Lee Generals football seasons
Washington and Lee Generals football